Roland Moyson (born 13 April 1934) is a Belgian former footballer. He played in one match for the Belgium national football team in 1956.

References

External links
 

1934 births
Living people
Belgian footballers
Belgium international footballers
Association football forwards
Footballers from Brussels
R. Daring Club Molenbeek players